Angelic script may refer to:
Malachim
Celestial Alphabet
Transitus Fluvii